Xystochroma femoratum is a species of beetle in the family Cerambycidae. It was described by Napp and Martins in 2005.

References

Callichromatini
Beetles described in 2005